Obroatis is a genus of moths of the family Noctuidae. The genus was erected by Francis Walker in 1858.

Species
Obroatis chloropis Hampson, 1926
Obroatis columba Butler, 1879
Obroatis curvilineata Dognin, 1912
Obroatis distincta Butler, 1879
Obroatis ellops Guenée, 1852
Obroatis gatena Schaus, 1912
Obroatis humeralis Walker, 1858
Obroatis licentiata Dognin, 1914
Obroatis negata Walker, 1858
Obroatis nigriscripta Dognin, 1912
Obroatis ocellata Butler, 1879
Obroatis reniplaga Schaus, 1912
Obroatis rhodocraspis Hampson, 1924
Obroatis rivularis Butler, 1879
Obroatis rufa Schaus, 1904
Obroatis signata Butler, 1879
Obroatis vinea Schaus, 1911

References

Calpinae